KTTS may refer to:

 The ICAO airport code for NASA Shuttle Landing Facility
 KTTS-FM, a radio station (94.7 FM) licensed to Springfield, Missouri, United States
 KGMY, a radio station (1400 AM) licensed to Springfield, Missouri, United States which held the call sign KTTS from 1942 to 1987
 KDE Text-to-speech engine